Yuri Viktorovich Mamontyev (born 15 March 1973) is a Russian former football player.

External links
 

1973 births
Footballers from Saint Petersburg
Living people
Soviet footballers
Russian footballers
Russia under-21 international footballers
FC Zenit Saint Petersburg players
Russian Premier League players
Association football midfielders
FC Zenit-2 Saint Petersburg players